In enzymology, a morphine 6-dehydrogenase is an enzyme that catalyzes the chemical reaction

morphine + NAD(P)+  morphinone + NAD(P)H + H+

The 3 substrates of this enzyme are morphine, NAD+, and NADP+, whereas its 4 products are morphinone, NADH, NADPH, and H+.

This enzyme belongs to the family of oxidoreductases, specifically those acting on the CH-OH group of donor with NAD+ or NADP+ as acceptor. The systematic name of this enzyme class is morphine:NAD(P)+ 6-oxidoreductase. Other names in common use include naloxone reductase, and reductase, naloxone. This enzyme participates in alkaloid biosynthesis i. This enzyme has at least one effector, Mercaptoethanol.

References

 
 

EC 1.1.1
NADPH-dependent enzymes
NADH-dependent enzymes
Enzymes of unknown structure